Lord Mackay may refer to 2 Scottish judges:
 Donald Mackay, Baron Mackay of Drumadoon (1946–2018)
 James Mackay, Baron Mackay of Clashfern (born 1927)

See also
 Lord Reay
 John MacKay, Baron MacKay of Ardbrecknish
 Ronald Mackay, Lord Eassie